A talking head is a television pundit. 

Talking head or talking heads may also refer to:

Music
 Talking Heads, an American rock band
 Talking Heads (album), a 2005 box set by Talking Heads
 "Talking Head", a song by Motörhead from the 1979 album Bomber
"Talking Heads", a 2019 single by Black Midi
 "Talking Heads", a song by Northlane from the 2019 album Alien

Television, theatre and film
 Talking Head (film), a 1992 film by Mamoru Oshii
 Talking Heads (series), a BBC television series by Alan Bennett
 Talking Heads (play), a 2003 stage adaptation of the BBC series
 Talking Heads (Australian TV series), a television series hosted by Peter Thompson
 Talking Heads, a 1980 short film by Krzysztof Kieślowski

Episodes
 "Talking Heads" (Body of Proof), an episode of the TV series Body of Proof
 "Talking Head", an episode of the TV series KYTV